Fiona Sit (born 11 August 1981) is a Hong Kong singer and actress.

Early life
In an interview with Hong Kong Newspaper Apple Daily in 2006, Fiona Sit revealed that she has always been interested in singing in front of an audience since a very young age, but growing up as the only child in the family left her with little opportunity to sing in front of people of her own age. So she enjoyed visiting her relatives' homes during her childhood in order to perform in front of her cousins and relatives.

She attended Island School and studied Creative Media in City University of Hong Kong until 2004. She used to be a part-time model, posing for adverts and magazines.

Her opportunity to sign a deal with Warner Music came through her uncle, Peter Wong, a senior manager at Capital Artists.

Career

Music
After joining Warner Music Group in 2003, Sit first plugged her debut song "XBF" and "Madonna's Kiss", catching attention from audiences. Sit released her first album F Debut on 8 April 2004.  It became a best-seller in Hong Kong, being certified gold for sales in excess of 25,000 copies. The album contained the hit ballad "XBF" (short for ex-boyfriend) and another hit "Keanu Reeves Reply". The song "Keanu Reeves Reply" reached No. 1 in the charts of the four TV and radio stations.

She published her debut Photobook F-Trip which sold with her limited set of "Fileee Doll", and was later sold it in Animation-Comic-Game Hong Kong. It was sold out in just four days.

Due to the success of F Debut, Warner Music Hong Kong released F Debut AVCD on 5 May 2004. F Debut AVCD included her famous song "Keanu Reeves Reply" and another version which featured Aaron Kwok as Mr. K singing his reply to Miss F.

As she became more well known in the entertainment industry, she shot many adverts in the year, such as Toshiba and Sagem.

At the age of 23, she won most newcomer awards in the year-end ceremony from Hong Kong Music Platforms. In the Ultimate Song Chart Awards Presentation, she triumphed over other artistes to win No. 7 with the song "Keanu Reeves Reply" and became the first newcomer who achieved the top 10 song in 903 Music Platform. She won a number of awards, including gold award for best female newcomer at the Hong Kong Music Awards, as well as a gold award for the song "Keanu Reeves' Reply."  she was also awarded the Best Selling Newcomer by IFPI.

On 7 January 2005, Warner Music released a single named 886. It included songs such as "Pumpkin Wagon" and "886", which is an abbreviation of Byebye in Cantonese ICQ language. The single was a huge success and it was sold out within 3 weeks.

Warner Music released her second album, Funnygirl, on 21 April 2005. Songs "Blackie and Me"and "A Boy Just Like You" reached No. 1 on the charts of 903, RTHK and TVB's JSG Solid Gold programme. Also, Funnygirl was one of the top 5 best selling albums in the year and was certified gold. Its success resulted in the release of Funnygirl (2nd Edition), which included a DVD of her music videos, including the No. 1 single "A Boy Like You".

Her third album, Me, was another CD+DVD combination released on 23 December 2005. It included No. 1 songs "There is a bird" and "Finding Unicorn", and the song "Love", which was featured in the film Embrace Your Shadow, which Sit starred in. The DVD was a live concert footage of her debut concert "903 Fiona 0811", held in HITEC on 29 December 2005.

In the year-end ceremony, not only did she win a number of awards, she was also shortlisted as one of the best five female singers in 903 Music Platform and TVB's JSG Music Platform together with Kelly Chen, Joey Yung, Miriam Yeung and Denise Ho.

Sit's official fan club, Club F was established on 11 August 2006 in conjunction with her 25th birthday. Her 4th album "Electric Angel" was released on the same day as well. 200 fans attended the first gathering, which was held in a Chinese restaurant in Wan Chai. The second edition was later released on 22 December 2006. It included 11 songs and some extra materials.

After Electric Angel, Sit went to Taiwan in order to improve her Mandarin skills. In order to keep her fanbase (Hong Kong artists usually release one to two albums per year to keep up their popularity), Warner released her first compilation, "F" Best, on 12 June 2007. This album includes 3 new songs with 15 selected songs from her previous albums. The album also includes a DVD containing a short film and some MVs of her songs. In addition, a special edition of "F" Best was sold out in one month.

After training in Taiwan for one year, Sit made her debut Mandarin album It's My Day which was released on 18 April 2008. The album was recorded in Taiwan and in Singapore. It features songs such as I don't need Tiffany, which refers to the jewelry company and a duet with Khalil Fong, Overcoming Memories. "It's My Day" was the first plugged song in Taiwan while "Alice's first Time" was the first plugged song in Hong Kong. This Mandarin album made Sit the best five sellers in the year in Hong Kong and became famous in Taiwan.

On 19 December 2008, Sit released another Cantopop album Smile. It included the songs in her drama "Last Smile, First Tear" and two No. 1 songs, "Sweet" and "The few seconds without breath".

Sit released an EP Read Me on 16 October 2009, which included four new cantopop songs and two Mandarin songs. Besides, her first plugged song "Tramcar" and third plugged song "Mu Rong Xue" reached No. 1 in two charts.

On the first day of 2010, Sit was awarded the #3 Copper Female Award in 903-year-end ceremony, for the first time.

On 18 July 2011, Sit released her new EP August Girl. It showcased a new style of Fiona Sit, with thematic song "The August Issue", two versions of "Word Flower", No. 1 song "Lip Stick", gimmick song "Before Taking off the Straps" and two Mandarin songs. She cooperated with a team of top songwriters including Khalil Fong, Wyman Wong, Hanjin Tan, Edward Chan, and Abrahim Chan.

She then released the album 'Tenacious' in 2013. She participated in writing two of the songs and it is her 10th anniversary album.

Fiona Sit's latest album 'Tonight' was released in 2014 September. This album has the same name as the concert she held in the same year.

Television series
Sit had a guest role in the TVB series Hearts of Fencing in 2003.

In 2005 Sit went on to film her first Hong Kong TVB series The Academy, her role was a female police trainee. To meet the job requirement of her character, Fiona cut her hair short.  In contrast to her past success, fans responded negatively towards this change in her image, and were wary of her future career decisions. She followed with a cameo performance on On The First Beat.  Sit also featured in a weight loss product TV commercial, in which she performed a dance routine. These two events were mocked in the Hong Kong media, and cut into her fanbase.

Despite the above, she won the Best Female newcomer in 2006 Next TV ceremony.

In late 2006, Sit went to China and shot a drama by Derek Tung, who was 2 Young's director. Since the schedules clashed, she can only be a guest star in TVB series "On The First Beat". The series was called C'est La Vie, Mon Chéri, she starred opposite Chinese actor Aloys Chen. It released after filming and was broadcast by TVB in 2008.

In 2007, she performed an internet drama hosted by Moov, with other singers like Endy Chown and Zarahn. From 2008 to 2009, she had a guest role in two TVB series "Dressage To Win" and "ICAC Investigators 2009".

In 2010, Sit shot another Mandarin series "Liao Zhai 3" and Painted Skin. From January to April 2011, she shot her second Mandarin fashionable costume series "White Lies".

Web series

Sit was the main cast member of ViuTV Shadow of Justice as Inspector Gan.

Film
On 28 April 2005, Sit's debuted in the film 2 Young. The film was cast by Derek Tung, and Sit starred opposite Jaycee Chan. She received praises from the audience and many famous artistes. After a month, 2 Young made $10 million in box office and Sit became a "10-million-dollar female actress".

Owing the success of 2 Young, she filmed another movie Embrace Your Shadow, it showed in September. Joe Ma did the casting and Sit starred opposite famous Taiwanese actor, Dylan Kuo. It was a challenge for Fiona Sit because the character was the complete opposite of her role in 2 Young.

In 2006, Sit was nominated in Hong Kong Hong Kong Film Awards and Taiwan Golden Horse Awards for "Best Newcomer Award"  for her role in "2 Young". Although she lost to Jay Chou, her acting was praised by a number of entertainers. She also got other nominations of "Best Newcomer" and "Best Actress" hosted by different entrepreneurship for 2 Young. Later, she filmed another movie "Love Undercover 3" directed by Joe Ma, which showed in June and earning a lot in the box office.

In 2007, she was the emcee for the Asian Film Awards. She later filmed "Wonder Woman" directed by Barbara Wong and collaborated with Gigi Leung. In 2009, Sit filmed two films "La Comédie humaine" and "Break Up Club". Sit was a girl named Flora in "Break Up Club" and starred opposite with Jaycee Chan again, she was another girl named Skylove in "La Comédie humaine" and starred opposite with Wong Cho-lam.

In the year of 2010, Break Up Club showed in June and La Comédie humaine showed in July. Among the two, Break Up Club achieved $10 million box office and Sit gained a great success from her performance in "Break Up Club" as she won the Best Actress in "Vietnam's film festival". Later, with her stand out performance, she won other film awards in Hong Kong, namely the "Best Actress" hosted by Mingpao, Yahoo!, and Hong Kong Performing Artistes Guild. Sit was also gained a nomination for "Best Actress" from Hong Kong Film Awards in 2011.

Due to her success in the movie industry, she filmed more movies which showed in 2011, such as The Way We Were and The Fortune Buddies.

With the success of "Girls" in 2014, Fiona starred in the second installment of the movie directed once again by Barbara Wong, "Girls 2" scheduled to premier in August 2017.

Discography
 (2004) F Debut
 (2005) Funny Girl
 (2005) Me 
 (2006) Electric Angel
 (2007) "F" Best (New + Best Selection)
 (2008) It's My Day 
 (2008) Smile
 (2009) Read Me
 (2011) August Girl
 (2012) Filicious
 (2012) The First Ten Years Collection' (Best Selection)
 (2013) Fiona Music Book EP 
 (2013) Tenacious
 (2014) Tonight
 (2017) You Make Me Feel
 (2022) Dream of Love

MV Direct
 (2014) Peace
(2014) 復原 / Fùyuán
(2014) 小小癡纏 / Xiǎo xiǎo chī chán
(2014) 最後最後 / Zuìhòu zuìhòu
(2014) 最後最後 / Zuìhòu zuìhòu / Micro Film
(2014) 一直一直 / Yīzhí yīzhí
(2015) 點水蜻蜓 / Diǎn shuǐ qīngtíng
(2017) 好好聽 / Hǎohǎo tīng
(2017) Don't let it go
(2020) 南昌街王子 / The Prince Near You

Concerts
 903 Hit Four Fiona 0811 Concert(熱火樂團) (2005)
 903 Hit Four Concert(熱火樂團熱火四俠) (2005) (Shawn Yue, Wilfred Lau and Kary Ng)
 903 Live Concert Fiona Sit X Stephanie Cheng (拉闊演奏廳) (2006)
 Roadshow Live Fiona Sit Concert (2007)
 903 id club (音樂游擊) 1st section Fiona Sit X Sammy Moving (2007)
 903 Live Concert Fiona Sit(拉闊變奏廳) 2 ng section (2008)
 Khalil Fong X Fiona Sit Awesome Concert (San Francisco & Los Angeles) (2010)
 903 Live Concert (拉闊擂台) 2nd section Fiona Sit X Dear Jane {Dear Fi} (2010)
 Khalil Fong & Fiona Sit Live in Australia 2010（Sydney & Adelaide & Melbourne ） (2010)
Khalil Fong & Fiona Sit Live in Australia 2010（ San Francisco & LA ） (2010)
 Fiona Sit MOOV LIVE 2011 (2011)
 Filicious Fiona in Concert 2012 (2012)
Fiona Neway Music Live (2013)
903id club Music is Live Eman Lam x Fiona Sit x vana Wong x Kary Ng (2013)
 Tonight Fiona Live 2014 (2014)
COURTURiSSIMO presents : Fiona Sit music experience 2017 picnic series #01 (2017)
Joox – Dear Jane X Fiona 《ON THE ROCKS》live (2019)
Sammi x Fiona x Gem x Rainie 《Music Unlimited》concert (2020)

Filmography

Film

Drama

Variety show

2020
• 花花萬物 Huāhuā wànwù

• 新聲請指教 Xīn sheng qǐng zhǐ jiào

2019
• The Big Band

• Sing Cantonese

2018
• The Perfect restaurant

• Do Re Mi

• Mask Singer Season 3

Editorial

2020
 Cle de peau Le Sérum x UNICEF Hong Kong Charity Campaign

2019–2015
 OLAY 1+1 Collagen
 OLAY Sunblock & Whitening essence 
 OLAY Air Cream
 OLAY Youth Project (Sunblock)
 DIOR 999 Ultra ROUGE
 DIOR Addict Lip Glow 
 YAZ The Most Prescribed Ultra-low Dose Pill 2018 Endorser
 MAC x Fiona Versicolour-varnish Promotion Video in Hong Kong
 Tom Ford Beauty – The Eyes of Tom Ford
 YAZ The Most Prescribed Ultra-low Dose Pill 2017 Endorser
 ELLE TV – MCM x Fiona Sit FASHION DAY & NIGHT
 Fresh x Fiona Sit Fresh Moments
 Dermes 2017 Endorser
 Dermes 2016 Endorser
 Dermes 2015 Endorser
 Collagen By Watsons Endorser (China)

2014–2008
 Adidas women – sport performance 2014 Endorser
 Lancôme HYPNOSE
 La Gusto Coffee Endorser
 Adidas women – sport performance TVC
 Adidas women – sport performance 2013 Endorser
 VICTORINOX Go Pink
 Dermes 2014 Endorser
 STACCATO
 Giordano
 Wyeth Nutrition (Ad song)
 PUMA
 Levi's Indigo Endorser
 Catalog
 Monalisa Bridal Salon Endorser
 L’oreal Gernier Skin care products
 Netvigator
 Levi's Luxury

2007–2001
 Japan Rabbit Annasalbe Ace Cream Endorser
 PCCW
 Netvigator
 3C Digital Chain Store
 Nin Jiom Pei Pa Koa
 Toshiba Notebook
 La Vallee Skin care products
 AMO Blink Complete Moisture Plus
 SAGEM Mobile Phone
 VITA fruit tea
 YOHO Town
 Coca-Cola
 Nestlé Yoghurt
 AIWA MD
 Motorola
 Bank of China Y’N Credit Card
 HSBC
 VITA

Awards

2016
 Weibo Star Award – Choral Award <結>
 Weibo Star Award – Top Ten Hong Kong Entertainment Celebrities (Eighth)
 Top Ten Chinese Gold Songs Award Concert – Outstanding Pop Singer Award
 《音樂先鋒榜》- Hong Kong and Taiwan Top Ten Songs <After 10 Years>
 《音樂先鋒榜》- Top 5 most popular singers (female singers)
 《音樂先鋒榜》- The most popular singer in Hong Kong and Taiwan (female singer)

2015
 Livetube MVA – The second quarter after quarter election group winning MV
 Ultimate Song Chart Awards Presentation – Professional recommendation "Top Ten" No. 5

2014
 The 37th Top Ten Chinese Gold Songs Award Concert – Top Ten song <宮若梅>
 Ultimate Song Chart Awards Presentation – Best Female Singer (Bronze Award)
 Hit Awards – Best songs <Last Dance>
 The 14th Global Chinese Music Awards – Top 20 Songs <弗洛蒙>
 The 14th Global Chinese Music Awards – Best Album <Tonight>
 The 14th Global Chinese Music Awards – Top five most popular female singers
 The 14th Global Chinese Music Awards – Best female singer
《音樂先鋒榜》- Top five most popular female singers of the year
《音樂先鋒榜》-  Best Female Singer (Hong Kong and Taiwan) jointly awarded by 24 radio stations of the year
《音樂先鋒榜》- Top Ten Songs in Hong Kong and Taiwan of the Year <Last Dance>
 Cosmopolitan Fun Fearless Awards – Fun Fearless Award
 Yahoo! Buzz Award – Popular songs <Last Dance>
 第十屆勁歌王金曲金榜年度音樂盛典 – Best Female singer (Hong Kong)
 第十屆勁歌王金曲金榜年度音樂盛典 – Best Cantonese Song <Last Dance>
 第十屆勁歌王金曲金榜年度音樂盛典 – Media Awards

2013
 Weibo Star Awards – Top Ten Influence Celebrities in Weibo
 Jade Solid Gold Best Ten Music Awards Presentation – Song <告別我>
 The 1st V Chart Awards – Hong Kong and Taiwan Female Artist of the Year
 The 1st V Chart Awards – Best MV <Better Me>
 Hit Awards – Metro Asian Singer Awards
 Hit Awards – Metro Best Song <諸葛亮>
 Ultimate Song Chart Awards Presentation – Best Female Singer (Silver Award)

2012
 The 12th Global Chinese Music Awards – Area Outstanding Artist Award
 第九屆勁歌王全球華人樂壇音樂盛典 – Best Cantonese Song <冷笑話>
 第九屆勁歌王全球華人樂壇音樂盛典 – Outstanding Performance Award
 第九屆勁歌王全球華人樂壇音樂盛典 – Favorite Singer Award
 Top Ten Chinese Gold Songs Award Concert – Best Progress Award of the Year (Silver Award)
 SINA Music Awards – Popular Singer Award
 Hit Awards – Metro Asian Singer Awards
 Hit Awards – Metro Best Song <冷笑話>
 Hit Awards – Metro Karaoke song "All You Need Is Me"

2011
 Hit Awards – Best Female Singer
 Hit Awards – Metro Best Song <除下吊帶前>

2010
 Vietnam International Film Festival Best Actress Award for "Break Up Club"
 Ultimate Song Chart Awards Presentation – Best Female Singer (Bronze Award)
 Hit Awards – Metro Best Song <除下吊帶前>
 Chinese Radio USA, Inc. Awards – Female Singer of the Year (Silver Award)
 SINA Music Awards – Advertising Song Awards <惠氏金裝膳兒加>
 Yahoo! Buzz Award – Top Ten Popular Songs <字花>
 Yahoo! Buzz Award – Top Ten Popular Actresses 
 Mingpao Weekly Awards – Best Female Actress 
 Hong Kong Performing Artistes Guild Awards – Outstanding Film Actress Award

2009
 Yahoo! Buzz Award – Top Ten Popular Songs <慕容雪>
 Hit Awards – Metro Original Songs <Tram>
 Hit Awards – Metro Best Songs <甜蜜蜜>
 Hit Awards – Metro Karaoke song <甜蜜蜜>
 SINA Music Awards – Top 20 songs with highest listening rate <Tram>
 SINA Music Awards – Highest Rating MV Award <慕容雪>
 Ultimate Song Chart Awards Presentation – Best Female Singer (Bronze Award)
 雪碧中國原創音樂流行榜 – Most potential singer (Hong Kong)
 雪碧中國原創音樂流行榜 – Hong Kong and Taiwan Best Song Award <蘇州河>

2008
 Metro Radio Mandarin Hits Music Awards Presentation – Metro Leap singer
 Metro Radio Mandarin Hits Music Awards Presentation – Mandarin Songs <愛麗絲的第一次>
 SINA Music Awards – Top 20 songs with highest listening rate <天國的微笑>
 SINA Music Awards – Highest Rating Award <It's my day>
 第五屆勁歌王金曲金榜年度音樂盛典 – Entertainer award
 第五屆勁歌王金曲金榜年度音樂盛典 – Internet Popular Female Singer Award
 第五屆勁歌王金曲金榜年度音樂盛典 –  Mandarin Songs <愛麗絲的第一次>
 Global Chinese Music Awards – The most popular duet song <復刻回憶>
 雪碧中國原創音樂流行榜 – Leap Performance Award (Hong Kong)
 Hit Awards – Metro Best Songs <天國的微笑>
 Hit Awards – Metro Original Songs <天國的微笑>

2007
 TVB " Jade Solid Gold" Best Choice Award, second round – Next Time
 Jade Solid Gold Best Ten Music Awards Presentation – Most Popular Chinese Song Award <四人遊> (Bronze Award)
 RoadShow至尊音樂頒獎禮 – Choral Award <四人遊>
 第四屆勁歌王年度總選頒奬典禮 – Entertainer award
 第四屆勁歌王年度總選頒奬典禮 – Song Award (Cantonese) <Little Canyon 1234>
 第四屆勁歌王年度總選頒奬典禮 – The most popular duet song <四人遊>
 The 1st Spectrum Radio Golden Rainbow Award – Favorite movie actress

2006
(Hong Kong)
 Hong Kong Top Sales Music Award – Top 10 best-selling local singers
 四台聯頒音樂大獎 – Outstanding Performance Award (Bronze Award)
 Commercial Radio – " Supreme Song " – The Seventh: Little Canyon 1234
 Hit Awards – Metro Best Songs <Tong But Lut>
 TVB " Jade Solid Gold" Best Choice Award, second round- Tong But Lut
 TVB "Jade Solid Gold" First round golden song – Finding Unicorn
 Next Media Television Award- New Artiste
 Next Media Television Award- Most Charming New Star
 SINA Music Awards – New song audition highest listening rate song #7 <Little Canyon 1234>
 SINA Music Awards – Highest Rating MV Award <Tong But Lut>
 Jade Solid Gold Best Ten Music Awards Presentation 1st round – Top Ten songs <尋找獨角獸>
 RoadShow至尊音樂頒獎禮 – Best Songs <Tong But Lut>
 RoadShow至尊音樂頒獎禮 – Most Popular Singer
 Yahoo! Most popular artist's Blog Award
(Mainland China)
 Guangzhou radio "Gold Song, Gold Chart" Most Famous Female Artist
 Guangzhou Radio "Golden Chart Award" All-round Artist (outside mainland china region)
 Guangzhou Radio "Golden Chart Award" Most Famous Female Artist (outside mainland china region)
 Guangzhou Radio "Golden Chart Award" Golden songs – Tong But Lut
 雪碧中國原創音樂流行榜 –  Favorite Popular Idol Award (Hong Kong)
 雪碧中國原創音樂流行榜 –  Favorite Popular Idol Award (Hong Kong and Taiwan)
 《音樂先鋒榜》- Most Popular Female Singer Award

2005
(Hong Kong)
Roadshow Popular Singer
Roadshow Hit Song – Little Dark and Me
Commercial Radio – " Supreme Song " – The Fifth: Little Dark and Me
TVB "Jade Solid Gold" – " Top Ten Gold Songs Award " – Boy Likes You
Metro Radio " Entertainment Television Award " – Super TV New Actress
Outstanding Website Award – Activities Promotion Ambassador
TVB "Jade Solid Gold" First round golden song – Little Dark and Me
Metro Hit Radio "Karaoke Hit Song" – Little Dark and Me
Metro Hit Radio – Popular Singer
Metro Hit Radio "Awards from 4 Stations" – Remarkable Performance – Gold Award
(Mainland China)
9 + 2 Music Pioneer Award New Female Singer Gold Award
Sprite China Original Music Chart " My Favourite Idol Award (Hong Kong) "
Sprite China Original Music Chart " Great Advancement Singer Award "
The third session of Southeast Power Music Award – Most promising future female singer in Hong Kong Region
Yue-Gang Future Super Star Award – Future Super Star

2004
(Hong Kong)
Metro Hit Radio "New Female Artiste"
Metro Hit Radio "My Favorite New Female Artiste"
Metro Hit Radio Original Music Award – Reply from Keanu Reeves
TVB "Jade Solid Gold"– "Most Favorite New Artiste"– Gold Award
Metro Hit Radio Best Lyric – Reply from Keanu Reeves
Commercial Radio "New Female Artiste"– Gold Award
Commercial Radio "The Excellent Performance Award presented by four Media Organizers" Bronze Award.
Commercial Radio – "Supreme Song"– The Seventh: Reply from Keanu Reeves
RTHK Top Ten Chinese Gold Songs Award "Ten Best Song" – Reply from Keanu Reeves
RTHK "Top Ten Chinese Gold Songs Award " New Female Artiste– Gold Award
Yahoo! Music Chart Top Ten Songs – Reply from Keanu Reeves
Yahoo! Potential Newcomers
IFPI The Best Sales Artist, Newcomer, Female
Road Show MV Direct Voting: Best new artist
PM Magazine – Cross inter-media female artist
TVB Golden Kid Songs Award "Top 10 Kid Songs" – Ugly Ducking Swam Lake
TVB "Jade Solid Gold " First round golden song – Reply from Keanu Reeves
TVB "Jade Solid Gold " First round new singer – Top new singer in three consecutive weeks
TVB "Jade Solid Gold " Second round golden song – 886
(Mainland China)
Guangzhou Radio "Golden Chart Award" – Queen of New Female Singer
Guangzhou Radio "Golden Chart Award" Golden Song – Reply from Keanu Reeves
Guangdong Radio Music Pioneer Award "Most Famous New Female Singer" – Gold Award
Southern City Daily Newspaper and Radio Guangdong "the 5th Year Chinese Music Media Award" – The Best New Artist
Guangzhou "the 2nd Year Music King Final Award – Most Promising New Artist
Guangzhou "the 2nd Year Music King Final Award" Golden Song – Reply from Keanu Reeves

References

External links

Fiona's Weibo
Fiona's Facebook
Fiona's Instagram
Fiona's YouTube

Cantopop singers
21st-century Hong Kong actresses
21st-century Hong Kong women singers
Hong Kong film actresses
Hong Kong television actresses
1981 births
Living people
Alumni of the City University of Hong Kong
People educated at Island School
Hong Kong idols
Warner Music Hong Kong artists